Armando Avila (born March 9, 2004) is an American soccer player who plays as a defender for USL Championship club Las Vegas Lights via the Los Angeles FC academy.

Club career
Born in San Pedro, California, Avila joined the academy at Major League Soccer club Los Angeles FC in 2018. On May 5, 2021, it was announced that Avila, along with three other academy players, had signed USL academy contracts with Los Angeles FC's USL Championship affiliate club Las Vegas Lights. The academy contract allowed Son to play with professionals while maintaining NCAA college soccer eligibility.

Avila made his professional debut for Las Vegas Lights on June 19, 2021 against Orange County SC. He came on as a 62nd minute substitute as Las Vegas lost 3–1.

Career statistics

References

2004 births
Living people
American soccer players
Association football defenders
Las Vegas Lights FC players
USL Championship players
Soccer players from Torrance, California